German submarine U-952 was a Type VIIC U-boat built for Nazi Germany's Kriegsmarine for service during World War II.
She was laid down on 1 February 1942 by Blohm & Voss, Hamburg as yard number 152, launched on 14 October 1942 and commissioned on 10 December 1942 under Oberleutnant zur See Oskar Curio.

Design
German Type VIIC submarines were preceded by the shorter Type VIIB submarines. U-952 had a displacement of  when at the surface and  while submerged. She had two shafts and two  propellers.

U-952 was fitted with five  torpedo tubes (four fitted at the bow and one at the stern), fourteen torpedoes, one  SK C/35 naval gun, 220 rounds, and one twin  C/30 anti-aircraft gun. The boat had a complement of between forty-four and sixty.

Service history
The boat's career began with training at 5th U-boat Flotilla on 10 December 1942, followed by active service on 1 May 1943 as part of the 3rd Flotilla for the next seven months. On 1 February 1944 she transferred to serve with 29th Flotilla, based in La Spezia, for Mediterranean operations.

Wolfpacks
U-952 took part in five wolfpacks, namely:
 Without name (5 – 10 May 1943)
 Isar (10 – 15 May 1943)
 Donau 1 (15 – 26 May 1943)
 Leuthen (15 – 24 September 1943)
 Rossbach (27 September – 6 October 1943)

Fate
U-952 was decommissioned on 12 July 1944 after being badly damaged on 5 July 1944 by US air raid. Her wreck was captured by French and broken up in 1946.

Previously recorded fate
U-952 was sunk on 6 August 1944 in the Military port of Toulon, France, in position , during an air raid by US Liberator bombers.

Summary of raiding history

See also
 Mediterranean U-boat Campaign (World War II)

References

Notes

Citations

Bibliography

External links

German Type VIIC submarines
1942 ships
U-boats commissioned in 1942
U-boats sunk in 1944
U-boats sunk by US aircraft
World War II shipwrecks in the Mediterranean Sea
World War II submarines of Germany
Ships built in Hamburg
Maritime incidents in August 1944